Seein' Things, also known as Seeing Things, was a 1908 French short silent comedy film directed by Georges Méliès.

Plot
A partygoer (played by Méliès) comes home very drunk, and finds that his drunkenness makes him see two of everything.

Release and reception
The film was released by Méliès's Star Film Company and is numbered 1460–1466 in its catalogues. The New York Mirror gave the film a brief review after its American release as Seeing Things in December 1909, saying that "the subject possesses a fair amount of amusing interest."

The film is currently presumed lost.

References

External links

Films directed by Georges Méliès
Lost French films
1908 films
French silent short films
French black-and-white films
French comedy short films
1908 comedy films
Silent comedy films
1900s French films